Sergei Anatolyevich Serchenkov (born 11 January 1969) is a former Russian football player.

External links
 

1969 births
Living people
Sportspeople from Khabarovsk Krai
Soviet footballers
Russian footballers
Association football defenders
Russian expatriate footballers
Expatriate footballers in Moldova
Expatriate footballers in Kazakhstan
Russian Premier League players
FC Lada-Tolyatti players
FC Kuban Krasnodar players
FC Spartak Semey players
FC SKA-Khabarovsk players
FC Smena Komsomolsk-na-Amure players